Mattydale is a hamlet (and census-designated place) in Onondaga County, New York, United States. The population was 6,446 at the 2010 census.

Mattydale is a community in the northeast part of the town of Salina and is a northern suburb of Syracuse.

Mattydale was named for the farm of Frank Matty.

Geography
Mattydale is located at  (43.098717, -76.143530). It is north of Syracuse.

The New York State Thruway (Interstate 90) passes across the community.  The Thruway intersects Interstate 81 west of Mattydale.

Mattydale is southwest of Syracuse Hancock International Airport and borders the community of Hinsdale.

Ley Creek, which flows along the south part of Mattydale, enters Onondaga Lake a few miles southwest of the village.

Demographics

As of the census of 2000, there were 6,367 people, 2,631 households, and 1,673 families residing in the community. The population density was 3,323.3 per square mile (1,280.4/km2). There were 2,804 housing units at an average density of 1,463.6/sq mi (563.9/km2). The racial makeup of the CDP was 94.33% White, 1.74% African American, 0.86% Native American, 0.80% Asian, 0.03% Pacific Islander, 0.68% from other races, and 1.55% from two or more races. Hispanic or Latino of any race were 2.14% of the population.

There were 2,631 households, out of which 29.8% had children under the age of 18 living with them, 42.5% were married couples living together, 15.6% had a female householder with no husband present, and 36.4% were non-families. 29.7% of all households were made up of individuals, and 13.2% had someone living alone who was 65 years of age or older. The average household size was 2.42 and the average family size was 2.99.

In the CDP, the population was spread out, with 25.4% under the age of 18, 7.4% from 18 to 24, 30.6% from 25 to 44, 20.0% from 45 to 64, and 16.5% who were 65 years of age or older. The median age was 37 years. For every 100 females, there were 91.4 males. For every 100 females age 18 and over, there were 86.3 males.

The median income for a household in the CDP was $35,387, and the median income for a family was $43,668. Males had a median income of $32,917 versus $25,808 for females. The per capita income for the CDP was $19,030. About 6.4% of families and 9.9% of the population were below the poverty line, including 11.4% of those under age 18 and 6.3% of those age 65 or over.

External links
 Salina Free Library

References

Hamlets in New York (state)
Census-designated places in New York (state)
Syracuse metropolitan area
Census-designated places in Onondaga County, New York
Hamlets in Onondaga County, New York